Shout is a 1991 American musical romance film directed by Jeffrey Hornaday and starring John Travolta as a music teacher who introduces rock and roll to a west Texas home for boys in 1955.

The film also features James Walters, Heather Graham, Richard Jordan, Linda Fiorentino, Scott Coffey, Charles Taylor, and Glenn Quinn as well as an early role for Gwyneth Paltrow.

Plot 
Jesse Tucker and his four friends live at Benedict Boys Home, under the strict guidance of headmaster Eugene Benedict, who has a daughter Sara. Newcomer music teacher Jack Cabe introduces them to rock and roll, until headmaster Benedict threatens to fire Cabe. Cabe instructs the boys to get a radio and listen to the show Midnight Rider. Jesse bets with the guys that he would have sex with Sara, but instead falls in love with her.

The boys go to the club where they see people enjoying rock and roll to the hilt; Jesse gets inspired and gives an impressive performance on stage. Cabe gets into an altercation with the town sheriff, who decides to find the truth about his past.

At school Jesse and his friends connect with the girls while attending a lecture on the corrupting effects of modern music and television. One of the guys who is attracted to Sara tells her about the bet. After her initial anger she is won over by Jesse by his honest demeanor and truth.

Cabe is discovered to be a murderer on the run and flees the police. Jesse steals Eugene's car and goes to Cabe, where Cabe confesses to killing a man while defending his black friend in a club where they were performing. Jesse asks him to stop running, but Jack rejects his advice.

The Benedict Boys band is scheduled to play at a fair, and they begin with usual music, but upon seeing Jack surrendering to police, Jesse starts playing rock and roll to the delight of young people and disapproval of the adults. Headmaster Benedict unsuccessfully tries to stop the band while his daughter resumes her relationship with Jesse.

Cast 
 John Travolta as Jack Cabe
 James Walters as Jesse Tucker
 Heather Graham as Sara Benedict
 Richard Jordan as Eugene Benedict
 Linda Fiorentino as Molly
 Scott Coffey as Bradley
 Glenn Quinn as Alan
 Sam Hennings as Travis Parker
 Michael Bacall as Big Boy
 Frank von Zerneck as Toby
 Gwyneth Paltrow as Rebecca
 Charles Taylor as Deputy

Reception
The film was poorly received by critics. On Rotten Tomatoes, it has a 20% approval rating based on 5 reviews, with an average score of 4/10.

References

External links 
 
 
 
 

1991 films
1990s teen drama films
1990s musical drama films
American coming-of-age films
American musical drama films
American teen drama films
Films directed by Jeffrey Hornaday
Films produced by Robert Simonds
Films about educators
Films set in 1955
Films set in Texas
Films shot in California
Universal Pictures films
Films scored by Randy Edelman
1991 directorial debut films
1991 drama films
1990s English-language films
1990s American films